This is a list of elections for the Parliament of Victoria, Melbourne, Australia.

See also
 Electoral districts of Victoria
 Members of the Victorian Legislative Assembly
 Members of the Victorian Legislative Council
Timeline of Australian elections

External links
 Results

 
Victoria
Elections